Sverker 21 is a tool steel manufactured by Uddeholms AB. It is primarily used for Cold Work applications such as blanking, piercing, cropping, bending, forming and cutting. It's a proprietary equivalent to D2 [tool steel].

International standards comparison chart

Chemical composition

Properties
Sverker 21 is characterized by high compressive strength, high
surface hardness after hardening, good though-hardening properties and high wear
resistance (abrasive type of wear profile). These characteristics combine to give a steel
suitable for the manufacture of medium run tooling for applications where abrasive
wear is dominant and the risk of chipping or cracking is not so high, e.g. for blanking and
forming of thinner, harder work materials.

Application areas
It is a 12% chromium steel suitable for medium production volume tooling where the production materials cause abrasive wear and the risk of chipping is not so high.

Other Uddeholm Cold Work Steels
Arne, 
Caldie, 
Calmax, 
Rigor, 
Sleipner, 
Sverker 3,  
Unimax, 
Vanadis 4 Extra, 
Vanadis 6, 
Vanadis 10, 
Vanadis 23, 
Vancron 40, 
UHB 11, 
Formax, 
Holdax,

References

Steels